The New Millennium Hall (Korean: 새천년기념관 also KonKuk University New Millennium Hall 건국대학교 새천년관 대공연장 and Konkuk University's Millennium Hall) It is the name given to a multipurpose structure located in North Chungcheong Province in the city of Seoul, capital of South Korea. It is a university auditorium, university administrative building and concert hall.
It is a privately owned facility that is part of the Konkuk University campus (건국대학교) and has been used over the years for numerous events, concerts, cultural Conferences and student activities and more. New Millennium Hall is situated nearby to International House, and close to University Residence C.

The Seoul campus is adjacent to the Konkuk University Station, which is serviced by Seoul Subway Line 2 and Line 7. The circular Line 2 offers access to downtown Seoul within one hour. Line 7 links the northern part of the city to the popular Gangnam District.

In 2017, the first National Developmental Disability Music Festival congress was held here. In 2022, the TV production subsidiary Gmmtv (linked to the Thai GMM Grammy Group) announced that the first Ohm and Nanon fan meeting in Korea would be held at this venue.

See also 
 Jamsil Arena
 Jangchung Arena

References

External links

Web Site

Buildings and structures in Seoul
Music venues in Seoul